Bolat is both a given name and surname. Notable people with the surname include:

Given name:
 Bolat Niyazymbetov, Kazakhstani boxer
 Bolat Nurgaliyev, Kazakhstani diplomat
 Bolat Raimbekov, Kazakhstani road bicycle racer

Surname:
 Sinan Bolat, Turkish footballer

Turkish-language surnames